Paul Gilligan (born 1948) is a retired Irish judge who served on the High Court and subsequently the Court of Appeal.

He was educated at Blackrock College. He attended University College Dublin and the King's Inns. Gilligan became a barrister in 1971 and a senior counsel in 1984. He also qualified as mediator. He was a legal advisor to an inquiry into Deposit interest retention tax conducted by the Public Accounts Committee, along with future Supreme Court judges Frank Clarke and Mary Irvine. He represented Charles Haughey at the McCracken Tribunal.

Gilligan was appointed to the High Court in 2003. He managed the Chancery division of the court for several years. He oversaw proceedings related to the occupation and demolition of Apollo House, Dublin and claims arising out of the Morris Tribunal.

He was a member of the Judicial Appointments Review Committee and served as President of the European Network of Councils for the Judiciary. He advised the judiciary of Bosnia-Herzegovina on the establishment of a judicial council.

He became a Judge of the Court of Appeal in December 2017. A vacancy arose following the appointment of Mary Finlay Geoghegan to the Supreme Court. He retired in May 2018.

He married Mary Cantrell, a solicitor, with whom he has four children.

References 

1948 births
21st-century Irish judges
20th-century Irish lawyers
Alumni of King's Inns
Living people
Alumni of University College Dublin
Judges of the Court of Appeal (Ireland)
High Court judges (Ireland)
People educated at Blackrock College